Beaconsfield is a suburb of Perth, Western Australia, located within the City of Fremantle. It was named after a property of the same name in the area in the
1880s; the name was officially adopted from the post office on 1 August 1894.
The name's origin is unknown, but it probably comes from the town in England or the Earl of Beaconsfield, Benjamin Disraeli, a former Conservative Prime Minister of the United Kingdom.

Beaconsfield is predominantly a low to medium density residential suburb with extensive community facilities including Fremantle College, several primary schools, and an array of open space recreation reserves and local shops.

Facilities and amenities

Parks and playgrounds
Beacy Park
Davis Park
Dick Lawrence Oval
Hilton Park Soccer Fields
Ken Allen Field
James Moore Pioneer Park
Bruce Lee Reserve

Transport facilities
Bus routes available

Schools and education
There are a number of schools in the suburb including several primary and one high school.
Beaconsfield Primary School
Winterfold Primary School
Christ the King School
Fremantle College
Fremantle Peel District Education

Sporting clubs
Hilton Park Junior Cricket Club 
Hilton Park Bowling & Recreation Club
Fremantle City Dockers Junior Football Club Inc.
Fremantle Roosters Rugby League Football Club Inc
Excalibur Fencing Club

Shops and shopping centre
Lefroy Road Shopping Centre

Notable citizens
 Peter Tagliaferri, a former mayor of the City of Fremantle between 2001 and 2009

Gallery

References

External links

Suburbs of Perth, Western Australia
Suburbs in the City of Fremantle
Beaconsfield, Western Australia